Hemidactylus foudaii is a species of gekko in the family Gekkonidae. The species is endemic to North Africa.

Etymology
The specific name, foudaii, is in honor of Egyptian conservationist Moustafa Mokhtar Fouda.

Geographic range
H. foudaii is found in Egypt and possibly Sudan.

Habitat
The natural habitats of H. foudaii are dry savanna, subtropical or tropical dry shrubland, and rocky areas.

Conservation status
H. foudaii is threatened by habitat loss.

References

Further reading
Baha El Din SM (2003). "A new species of Hemidactylus (Squamata: Gekkonidae) from Egypt". African J. Herp. 52 (1): 39–47. (Hemidactylus foudaii, new species).

Hemidactylus
Vertebrates of Egypt
Geckos of Africa
Reptiles described in 2003
Taxonomy articles created by Polbot